A Florida Western can be used to describe a small number of films and literature set in the 19th century, particularly around the time of the Second Seminole War. Not a significant number of these films have been made, as most Hollywood and other genre westerns are usually located in other regions of the United States, particularly the former frontier territories of "the West".

A series of novels about Florida in the 19th century and their Florida cracker characters have been called Cracker Westerns.

Literature
In 1895 Frederic Remington and Owen Wister traveled to Florida to write a story on Florida's cowboys for Harper's Weekly.

In the 1990s a series of Cracker Westerns by several authors were published.

In 2014 Rough Edges Press published Palmetto Empire by David Hardy. This novel follows the fictional adventures of backwoodsmen, outlaws, and rebels in the era of the First Seminole War.

Films

It was during the 1950s that most of these films were produced and many included a fictional and stereotypical portrayal of the real life Seminole leader, Osceola, who resisted American expansion into Florida during the late 1830s.  The film Distant Drums (1951), which was one of the earliest Florida Westerns made, even changed his name to Oscala and portrayed him as a malevolent savage, filled with a constant bloodlust who fed living prisoners to alligators.

One of the advantages of these types of films, however, was that the producers often used the Florida Everglades as a backdrop. Now a contemporary audience has the benefit of glimpsing this wilderness in its mid-20th century form. The producers of Distant Drums even used the historic Castillo de San Marcos fort as a backdrop for the story. It was depicted as a fictitious stronghold for Spanish gunrunners selling armaments to the Seminole on the west coast of Florida, although it is actually located on the east coast.

Films which were made and could be considered Florida Westerns include:

Drums of Destiny (1937), directed by Ray Taylor and starring Tom Keene 
The Yearling (1946) directed by Clarence Brown and starring Gregory Peck and Jane Wyman, filmed in the Ocala National Forest
Distant Drums (1951), directed by Raoul Walsh and starring Gary Cooper
The Barefoot Mailman (1951) directed by Earl McEvoy and starring Robert Cummings
Shark River (1953)
Seminole (1953), starring Anthony Quinn as Osceola
Yellowneck (1955), a B-grade film set during the Civil War
Naked in the Sun (1957), one of the few films to show Native Americans being used as slaves by white Americans
Wind Across the Everglades (1961) directed by Nicholas Ray and starring Burl Ives
Johnny Tiger (1966)
 (1971), an obscure East German/ Cuban co-production
Joe Panther (1976), starring Brian Keith

Notes

Film genres
Films set in Florida
Florida cracker culture
Western (genre) films by genre
Western (genre) subgenres